Al-Nour (The Light) is a radio station based in Beirut, Lebanon. The station was established on 9 May 1988 and is owned by Hezbollah.

In July 2006, during the 2006 Lebanon War, Israel attacked Hezbollah's TV station Al-Manar and radio station Al-Nour in Haret Hreik.

Objectives
Al Nour has stated its objectives as:
Introducing culture as well as values that stem from divine messengers and to protect the origins of Lebanese culture.
To protect their national interests by exposing major issues that threaten its interest such as facing the plans of Zionist imperialism.
To arouse the nation and steering its capabilities towards the support of the resistance in order to liberate their land.
Building a conscious generation by looking into the problems of the young and protecting them by building their intellect.
Looking into the problems of all righteous nations.
Working objectively as a media that will establish an effective and productive public opinion.
Contributing in order to socially develop awareness in the fields of politics, economy, environment, health and science.

Terrorism Designation
Al-Nour is designated by the US OFAC as a Specially Designated Global Terrorist group, which allows the US to block the assets of foreign individuals and entities that commit, or pose a significant risk of committing, acts of terrorism.

See also
Hezbollah
Al-Manar 
2006 Lebanon War
Specially Designated Global Terrorist

References

External links
Al-Nour official website
 

1988 establishments in Lebanon
Radio stations in Lebanon
Arabic-language radio stations
Organizations based in Asia designated as terrorist
Mass media in Beirut
Radio stations established in 1988
Hezbollah propaganda organizations